Atsabe (in ancient sources: Artessabe, Atisasabo) is a town in Atsabe Subdistrict in the Ermera District of East Timor.

References

Populated places in East Timor
Ermera Municipality